Silvia Grünberger (born 3 July 1981) is a former Austrian politician. She was a member of the National Council from 2002 to 2013.

References 

Members of the National Council (Austria)
21st-century Austrian women politicians
21st-century Austrian politicians
Austrian People's Party politicians
1981 births
Living people